The 2008 Golden Spin of Zagreb was the 41st edition of an annual senior-level international figure skating competition held in Zagreb, Croatia. It was held at the Dom Sportova between November 13 and 16, 2008. Skaters competed in the disciplines of men's singles, ladies' singles, pair skating, and ice dancing. The compulsory dance was the Paso Doble.

Results

Men

Ladies

Pairs

Ice dancing

External links
 2008 Golden Spin of Zagreb results
 Golden Spin of Zagreb 

Golden Spin of Zagreb
Golden Spin Of Zagreb, 2008
Golden Spin Of Zagreb, 2008
2000s in Zagreb